Onychoptosis defluvium (also known as "Alopecia unguium") is casting off the nail seen in association with alopecia areata.

See also
 Nail Anatomy

References

Conditions of the skin appendages